Paul Marcel Mercioiu (born 19 September 2003) is a Romanian professional footballer who plays as a forward for Corvinul Hunedoara, on loan from top-flight club UTA Arad.

Club career

UTA Arad

He made his Liga I debut for UTA Arad against CFR Cluj on 26 September 2021.

Career statistics

Club

References

External links
 
 Paul Mercioiu at lpf.ro

2003 births
Living people
Sportspeople from Arad, Romania
Romanian footballers
Romania youth international footballers
Association football forwards
Liga I players
FC UTA Arad players
Liga III players
CS Corvinul Hunedoara players